Fatić is a Serbo-Croatian surname. Notable people with the surname include:

Ivan Fatić (born 1988), Montenegrin footballer
Nerman Fatić (born 1994), Bosnian tennis player
Savo Fatić (1889-1948), Montenegrin and Yugoslav jurist

Bosnian surnames
Montenegrin surnames
Patronymic surnames